Jane Fiona Catherine Stevenson (born 18 February 1971) is a British Conservative Party politician who was elected as the Member of Parliament (MP) for Wolverhampton North East at the 2019 general election.

Early life and music career

Stevenson was born and raised in Wolverhampton. Her father was from Northern Ireland and settled in Wolverhampton in the 1950s. He lived in Bushbury for the last 30 years of his life. Her mother is from the Mattox family, whose roots in Wednesfield go back to the 18th century.

Before entering politics, Stevenson worked as a classical singer. Having performed with local orchestras while studying at Wolverhampton Girls' High School, she won an entrance scholarship to the Guildhall School of Music in London. After completing post-graduate opera studies. Stevenson freelanced as a soprano soloist for many years. She has also taught singing.

Her singing engagements included roles with English Touring Opera and the Early Opera Company. She also performed at concerts at the Royal Albert Hall and Symphony Hall, Birmingham. International work included the Harare International Festival of the Arts (HIFA) in Zimbabwe and concerts in the United Arab Emirates and Uganda. European cities she performed in included Paris, Rome, Berlin, Salzburg and Vienna. She has also performed in Subotica, Serbia, one of Wolverhampton's twin towns.

Political career
Stevenson has been interested in politics since her teens. She first attended the Conservative Party Conference in the early 1990s with a group from Wolverhampton, which included then MP Nick Budgen, one of the original Maastricht Rebels. Having campaigned for Vote Leave in Wolverhampton, in 2016 Stevenson decided to get more involved in the Conservative Party. Before standing for Parliament in 2019, she served as Deputy Chairman (Political) for the Black Country Area and was elected as a city councillor for Wolverhampton in 2018. At the 2019 general election, she defeated the incumbent Labour MP, Emma Reynolds, who had represented the constituency since the 2010 general election. As of March 2020 Stevenson is on the Consolidation, &c., Bills (Joint Committee).

On 16 June 2021, Stevenson introduced a ban on glue traps to Parliament, saying, "When pest control is needed, we have a responsibility to use the most humane methods in order to prevent unnecessary suffering. A rodent stuck in a glue trap will suffer a slow and painful death, which isn't acceptable when other pest control methods are available."

Personal life
Jane is a descendent of the well-known Mattox family in Wolverhampton. She is a passionate dog advocate and animal lover, owning two personally, and her favourite biscuit is the Garibaldi biscuit.

References

External links

1971 births
Living people
UK MPs 2019–present
Conservative Party (UK) councillors
Conservative Party (UK) MPs for English constituencies
Councillors in Wolverhampton
English operatic sopranos
English people of Northern Ireland descent
Female members of the Parliament of the United Kingdom for English constituencies
Musicians from Staffordshire
Musicians from Wolverhampton
Politicians from Staffordshire
20th-century British women opera singers
21st-century British women politicians
21st-century British women opera singers
Women councillors in England